Middlesbrough Football Club is a professional football club in Middlesbrough, England, who compete in the EFL Championship, the second tier of English football. Formed in 1876, they have played at the Riverside Stadium since 1995. The club played at Ayresome Park for 92 years, from 1903 to 1995.

Middlesbrough were one of the founding members of the Premier League in 1992 and became one of the first clubs to be relegated from it following the 1992–93 season. The club came close to folding in 1986 after experiencing severe financial difficulties before they were saved by a consortium led by then board member and later chairman Steve Gibson. During the early Gibson years in the Premier League the club signed several high-profile players, although this did not translate into success and in 1997 the club suffered two lost cup finals and a relegation in the same year. The club's main rivals are Sunderland, Newcastle United and Leeds United.

The club's achievements include winning the League Cup in 2004, their first and to date only major trophy, and they also reached the 2006 UEFA Cup Final, losing to Spanish club Sevilla. Their highest league finish to date was third place in the top flight in the 1913–14 season and the club have only spent two seasons outside the top two divisions of English football. The League Cup win and the UEFA Cup run was part of an 11-year consecutive stay in the Premier League, before a relegation in 2009. Although the club returned in 2016, instant relegation followed, and the club has not returned to the Premier League since.

The club's traditional kit is red with white detailing. The home shorts and sock colours have interchangeably been shifted between red and white, complementing the red shirt that was adopted in 1899. The various crests throughout the club's history, the most recent of which was adopted in 2007, incorporate a lion rampant.

History

Formation and early years (1876–1914)

Middlesbrough were formed in 1876, and won the FA Amateur Cup in 1895 and again in 1898. The club turned professional in 1889, but reverted to amateur status in 1892. They turned professional permanently in 1899. After three seasons, they won promotion to the First Division, where they would remain for the next .

In 1903, the club moved to Ayresome Park, their home for the next . In 1905, the club sanctioned the transfer of Alf Common for £1,000, a record fee. Over the next few years, their form fluctuated greatly, rising to sixth in 1907–08 before dropping to 17th two seasons later. The club rose to their highest league finish to date, third, in 1913–14. World War I soon intervened and football was suspended.

Ups and downs (1914–1966)
Before league football resumed, Middlesbrough won the Northern Victory League, but the team were unable to maintain their previous form and finished the 1919–20 season in mid-table. They remained in the First Division for the next few seasons, but were relegated in 1923–24 after finishing bottom, 10 points adrift of their nearest rivals. Three seasons later, they won the Division Two title. During that season, debutant George Camsell, who had signed from Third Division North side Durham City the previous season, finished with a record 59 league goals, which included nine hat-tricks. He would continue as top scorer for each of the next 10 seasons. Their tenure back in the top flight lasted only one season, and the club were relegated. They were promoted at the first attempt in 1928–29, winning another Second Division title. The club remained in the First Division until 1954.

The decade before the war saw the emergence of Wilf Mannion and George Hardwick, both of whom would go on to become England internationals in the years ahead. Middlesbrough climbed to fourth in the last full season before World War II and were expected to challenge for the title next season, but the war intervened. After the war, the club was unable to recover the form of the previous seasons and hovered around mid-table and exited in the early rounds of the FA Cup. Soon afterwards, the team began to falter, eventually suffering relegation in 1953–54. This was the start of a 20-year spell outside the top division, but saw the emergence of one of the club's top goalscorers, Brian Clough, who scored 204 goals in 222 games, before he left for Sunderland. Over that period, Middlesbrough maintained reasonable progress in the Second Division but were never serious contenders for promotion. After a fourth-place finish in 1962–63, the club endured a steady decline and were relegated to the Third Division for the first time in their history in 1966.

Resurgence and financial crisis (1966–1994)
New manager Stan Anderson returned the club to the second flight at the first attempt. Middlesbrough would not finish below ninth during the next eight seasons. By 1974, Jack Charlton had taken over as manager and guided the team back to the top flight. They ensured promotion as early as 23 March, and with eight games of the season left, they became runaway champions, finishing with a record 65 points. Middlesbrough won their first silverware as a professional side in the 1975–76 season, lifting the Anglo-Scottish Cup in its inaugural season after a two-legged final win over Fulham.

The club experienced severe financial difficulties during the mid-1980s. Middlesbrough were dropping down the table, and finished 19th in the 1984–85 season. In April 1986, the club had to borrow £30,000 from the Professional Footballers' Association (PFA) to pay wages. The final game of the season saw Middlesbrough relegated to the Third Division again. That summer, the club called in the Provisional Liquidator and shortly afterwards, the club was wound up and the gates to Ayresome Park were padlocked. Without the £350,000 capital required for Football League registration, a new rule, it seemed inevitable that the club would fold permanently. Steve Gibson, however, a member of the board at the time, brought together a consortium, and with 10 minutes to spare before the deadline they completed their registration with the Football League for the 1986–87 season. Following the registration came both a change of club crest and a change of the official company name to Middlesbrough Football and Athletic Club (1986) Ltd.

Over the next two seasons, Middlesbrough gained successive promotions into Division Two and then into Division One. The next season, however, they came straight back down to Division Two, and with it came the then British transfer record move of Gary Pallister to Manchester United for £2.3 million. Despite constant promotion and relegation, Middlesbrough were founding members of the FA Premier League for the 1992–93 season.

The Bryan Robson years (1994–2001)
Player-manager Bryan Robson, from Manchester United, took charge in 1994 and Middlesbrough were brought back into national attention. Following promotion to the Premier League and high-profile purchases like Brazilian international Juninho, many considered Middlesbrough to be on the rise. A difficult 1996–97 season, however, was compounded by a deduction of three points imposed just after Christmas as punishment for the club's failure to fulfil a fixture against Blackburn Rovers, which ultimately resulted in relegation. Without the points deduction imposed by the FA Premier League despite the club having taken advice from the Premier League themselves prior to calling off the match, the club would have had enough points to avoid the drop. At the same time, the club managed to reach both the League and FA Cups finals for the first time, but lost out in both. Despite being in the second tier, they were again runners-up in the League Cup final the next year.

Despite losing high-profile players Fabrizio Ravanelli and Juninho due to relegation, Middlesbrough were promoted back to the Premier League at the first attempt, in 1998. The following season saw them settle well and they enjoyed a 12-game unbeaten run midway through 1998–99, including a 3–2 win at Old Trafford in January during which they took a 3–0 lead; it was Manchester United's only home defeat during their treble-winning season. Middlesbrough continued to stay secure in mid-table the following season, thanks mainly to the goals of Hamilton Ricard and the signings of big name players such as Paul Ince and Christian Ziege. In 2000–01, they had a brief relegation scare that was solved with the arrival of Terry Venables as co-manager, and a 3–0 win away at Arsenal in April was the team's best result. The trend of buying European stars continued with the acquisitions of Christian Karembeu and Alen Bokšić. Bryan Robson left the club before the start of 2001–02 season, having served as manager for seven years.

Return to top flight and venture into Europe (2001–2009)
Robson was replaced by Manchester United assistant coach Steve McClaren. The following seasons saw Premier League security maintained as Middlesbrough slowly improved and were seen as a tough side to beat when playing at the Riverside Stadium. During McClaren's reign, Middlesbrough achieved their highest Premier League placing, finishing seventh in 2004–05.

The 2003–04 season was the most successful in the club's history as they finally won a major trophy after beating Bolton Wanderers 2–1 in the League Cup final under McClaren. This success also ensured that Middlesbrough would qualify for Europe – the UEFA Cup – for the first time, ultimately reaching the last 16 in the competition. UEFA Cup qualification was achieved for the second consecutive year after a dramatic 1–1 away draw with Manchester City thanks to a late penalty save from Mark Schwarzer in the final game of the season.

A notable event in the 2005-06 season was the final Premier League game against Fulham, where 15 of the 16 squad members were from the local area (the exception being Malcolm Christie). When Josh Walker replaced Malcolm Christie after 62 minutes the 11 players on the field were all born within 30 miles of Middlesbrough and all graduates of the club's academy. It was also the first all English starting line up in the Premier League since Bradford City in 1999, the first all English match squad since Aston Villa in 1998 and the youngest starting line-up in Premier League history.

Middlesbrough reached the 2006 UEFA Cup Final in Eindhoven, following two comebacks from 3–0 down in the rounds preceding it, but lost 4–0 to Sevilla.

Following the cup final disappointment, McClaren left to manage the England national team, and captain Gareth Southgate took over. Despite not having the coaching qualifications, he was allowed to continue after receiving special dispensation. During the 2007–08 season, Southgate broke Middlesbrough's record transfer fee, paying £13.6 million for Brazilian international striker Afonso Alves. Southgate's first two seasons saw the club finish in 12th and 13th places. He oversaw the club reaching the quarter-finals of the FA Cup for three seasons, but the club was relegated to the Championship on the last day of the 2008–09 season.

Decline, brief revival and relegation (2009–2017)
Southgate was sacked in October 2009 and replaced by Gordon Strachan. At the time of Southgate's dismissal, Boro were fourth in the Championship and only one point away from the automatic promotion spot, but their form under Strachan was significantly worse and they finished mid-table.

Despite starting the 2010–11 campaign as promotion favourites, the club started the season poorly and Strachan resigned on 18 October, to be replaced by Tony Mowbray. Following a poor run of form in the 2013–14 campaign, Mowbray left the club with immediate effect on 24 October.

Aitor Karanka, a former Spain international defender and assistant coach at Real Madrid to José Mourinho, became the new Middlesbrough manager, signing a two-year contract. He became the first non-British manager at the club, which finished the season 12th in the final league standings. In his first full season in charge, Middlesbrough finished fourth and thus qualified for the 2015 Football League play-offs. After seeing off Brentford 5–1 on aggregate in the semi-final, the club lost 0–2 to Norwich City at Wembley Stadium in the final. Under Karanka's tutelage, Patrick Bamford, on loan from Chelsea, won the Championship Player of the Year award for 2014–15. The next season, Middlesbrough were promoted back to the Premier League after finishing second in the Championship in 2015–16, drawing 1–1 with Brighton & Hove Albion on the final day of the season.

Karanka was sacked in March 2017 following a poor run of form, and the team were relegated after just one season back in the top flight in 19th place. The team won only 5 league games, and scored 27 goals, the lowest in the league.

Return to the Championship (2017–present)
The club appointed former Leeds United manager Garry Monk as manager in the off-season. Expectations at the club were high, having spent close to £50 million in the transfer window on player purchases, in order to mount an immediate promotion challenge back to the Premier League. Monk left in December, with Middlesbrough ninth in the Championship and underachieving, and Tony Pulis was appointed as his replacement. Pulis led the side to finish 5th in the table to qualify for the playoffs, but lost in the semi-final to Aston Villa. The following season Pulis looked to secure the playoffs once again, but a poor finish to the season caused them to finish 7th and miss out on the playoffs by one point. Pulis subsequently left his position at the club after his contract expired on 17 May 2019.

Pulis was replaced by former Middlesbrough defender and first team coach, Jonathan Woodgate on 14 June 2019 on a three-year contract. From March to June 2020 the 2019–20 season was suspended due to the COVID-19 pandemic. After a run of only one win in 12 games, which saw the team drop as low as 21st in the table, Woodgate was sacked on 23 June 2020, after a 3–0 defeat to Swansea City in the first game after the restart. Former Cardiff manager Neil Warnock was appointed as his replacement on the same day, who ensured survival from relegation with a 17th-place finish. On 6 November 2021, Warnock and his assistants, Kevin Blackwell and Ronnie Jepson left Middlesbrough by mutual consent with the club having already identified Warnock's replacement in Chris Wilder.

After just over 11 months in charge, Wilder was sacked on 3 October 2022, following a defeat away to bottom-of-the-league Coventry City the previous weekend. He was replaced by Michael Carrick three weeks later on 24 October 2022.

Colours and crest

Middlesbrough's original home kit upon election to the Football League in 1899 was a white home shirt with blue shorts and they did not adopt their colours of red and white until later that season. Previous kits included a white shirt with a blue and white polka dotted collar from around 1889. The Middlesbrough kit has remained broadly the same since 1899; a red shirt with white detailing, with shorts and socks of either red or white. The distinctive broad white stripe across the chest was introduced by Jack Charlton in 1973 (following an attempt to change the home shirt to a Leeds United-style white shirt) and brought back for a one-off in 1997–98 and then again for the 2000–01 and 2004–05 seasons due to popular demand. The club subsequently announced in December 2007 that the club would allow the fans to decide via an online and text vote whether the white band should return for the following season. On 8 January 2008, the club announced that the white band was to return, with 77.4% of voters voting in its favour, with the fans to choose the final shirt design from a selection of three designs, of which the winner was announced on 7 May 2008.

The Middlesbrough crest has gone through four changes since the formation of the club. Initially, the badge was simply the town of Middlesbrough's crest with a red lion instead of a blue lion in order to fit in with the club's colours. Following the adoption of the white band on the shirts in 1973, only the red lion remained with the letters "M.F.C" underneath in red. This was further adapted following the reformation of the club in 1986 to a circular crest with the lion in the middle and the words "Middlesbrough Football Club 1986" around the circle in order to reflect this new era. In 2007, Middlesbrough changed their crest again, this time with the lion inside a shield and the words "Middlesbrough Football Club 1876" underneath. The club stated that this was to reflect the club's long history and not just their post-liquidation status.

Kit information

Stadium

After formation in 1876, and with the club still amateurs, Middlesbrough's first two years of football were played at Albert Park in Middlesbrough. After seeing the damage being caused by players and supporters, the Park Committee ordered the club to find an alternate venue. The club moved to Breckon Hill, behind the former Middlesbrough College longlands site, after agreeing to rent the land from its owner. However, two years later in 1880, the owner increased the rent and the club decided to move. They moved into the Linthorpe Road ground in 1882, home at the time of Middlesbrough Cricket Club. The cricket club departed in 1893–94 to move to the Breckon Hill field, and Middlesbrough Football Club became sole users of the ground.

With the club's growing size, and entry to the Football League, they had to move to a new ground in 1903, Ayresome Park. It was designed by Archibald Leitch and would be the club's home for the next 92 years, having also been chosen as one of the stadia for the 1966 FIFA World Cup. Following the Taylor Report in 1990, the ground either needed modernising or the club needed a new stadium. The club decided on the latter, and moved out at the end of the 1994–95 season. It was used as a training ground during 1995–96, before it was demolished in 1997 and a housing estate built in its place. The club now trains at a £7 million complex at Rockliffe Park, in Hurworth, on the outskirts of Darlington.

The Riverside Stadium, named by the supporters of the club after a vote, became the club's home in 1995. It was the first stadium to be built in line with the Taylor Report's recommendations on all-seater stadiums for clubs in the top two divisions of the English football league system. It was originally a 30,000-seater stadium, constructed at a cost of £16 million, before it was expanded in 1998 to a capacity of 35,100 for an extra £5 million.

Since then, several reorganisations of the Riverside Stadium have taken place. At the start of the 2013–14 season, away fans were moved from behind the goal in the South stand to the South East corner, while home fans are now situated behind both goals to help create a better atmosphere inside the stadium. A giant TV screen was also installed at the back of the South-East corner, replacing the older style scoreboards attached to the North and South stand roofs. For the start of the 2016–17 season (and a return to the Premier League), the club had to improve the stadium's broadcasting facilities and floodlighting in order to meet current Premier League requirements. The club also took the opportunity to move the main camera gantry to the back of the East stand where it now faces the main West stand.  The current stadium capacity as of the 2017–18 season is 34,000.

Average attendances at Middlesbrough matches have fluctuated over the past several years, moving from a 2004–05 high average of 32,012 to a low of 26,092 in 2006–07, then up again to 28,428 in 2008–09. Following relegation to the Championship, attendances dipped, although the crowd of 23,451 which saw Middlesbrough's first Championship game against Sheffield United represents far higher gates than is usual for the division, and indeed larger than those of some Premier League clubs. The club attracted an average of 24,627 for their 2015–16 promotion season from the Championship to the Premier League.

Supporters
Traditionally supporters come from Middlesbrough itself and towns in the immediate area. Middlesbrough have one of the highest proportions in Britain of locally born season ticket holders at 80%, and one of the highest proportions of female fans at 20%. A survey at the start of the 2007–08 season found Middlesbrough supporters were the seventh-loudest set of fans in the Premier League. Middlesbrough Official Supporters Club, which features its own team in the local football league, has links with supporters' clubs across the globe. The largest supporters' clubs include the Official Supporters' Club, the Middlesbrough Disabled Supporters' Association, Yarm Reds, Red Faction and Middlesbrough Supporters South.

Middlesbrough supporters' main rivals are Sunderland (with whom they contest the Tees–Wear derby), Newcastle United (with whom they contest the Tyne–Tees derby), and Leeds United, a fact confirmed by planetfootball.com's 2004 survey. Carlisle United see Middlesbrough as their biggest rivals, but Middlesbrough supporters have not reciprocated, as they do not see Carlisle as a top three rival.

The nickname Smoggies was first used as a derogatory term by opposing supporters; it relates to the industrial air pollution – smog – that used to hang over the town, but it was later used by Middlesbrough fans in a somewhat self-deprecating manner before finally being adopted as a badge of pride by supporters of the club. An example of this can be seen on the banners carried to away games stating "Smoggies on Tour". Middlesbrough fans were notably praised by UEFA Chief Executive Lars-Christer Olsson after their behaviour during the 2005–06 UEFA Cup campaign. He commended that: Middlesbrough fans had also been praised by Cleveland Police for their behaviour in previous rounds, particularly in the light of aggravation prior to and during the match at Roma.

Media relations
Middlesbrough was the first football club in the world to launch its own TV channel – Boro TV. The first broadcasts were tied to the club's first ever major cup final appearance in 1997, a full year ahead of Manchester United's MUTV, which still claims to be the first in the world. The channel was the brainchild of then NTL marketing director, Peter Wilcock. The programme became synonymous with former Middlesbrough star Bernie Slaven and radio commentator Alastair Brownlee who proved to be as popular on TV as they were on radio. Its programmes were not live initially but were pre-recorded and hosted by local radio/TV broadcaster & Boro fan, Dave Roberts. Boro TV went on to claim another first when in August 2001 it became the first English football club to broadcast time-delayed full-match footage of their league games on its own channel. Boro TV ran through NTL cable television until July 2005. The club now shows match highlights through a subscription-based scheme on its official website.

Middlesbrough's official matchday programme, Redsquare, was Programme Monthly's 2006–07 Programme of the Year. There are numerous other fanzines available, most notably Fly Me to the Moon, formed in September 1988 following Bruce Rioch's quote to Tony Mowbray, stating "If I had to go to the moon I'd want him by my side".

Community
Middlesbrough Football Club in the Community (MFCIC) was founded in 1996 by club chairman Steve Gibson and is one of the largest community-based football schemes in the United Kingdom. It is run separately from the football club but receives support from both the club in terms of providing players, staff, stadium facilities and PR in the matchday programme and other publications, as well as support from other local organisations. In 2012 MFCIC was relaunched as MFC Foundation. The Foundation aims to use the club's profile to deliver sport, health, education and inclusion projects in vulnerable and disadvantaged communities across Teesside. Since 1996 the Foundation has delivered 20,000 qualifications, engaged over 500,000 people and invested £25 million in local communities to tackle inequality and disadvantage.

Since 2002, the club and MFCIC have also run the Middlesbrough Enterprise Academy, a scheme which helps local children improve their entrepreneurial skills and increase their awareness of business planning and finance. In March 2008, plans were announced by the Premier League to roll out the scheme nationally amongst all Premier League clubs.

It was announced in December 2007 that Middlesbrough football club had carried out more community work during 2006–07 than any other Premier League club, rising from second place the previous year, with the club making 318 appearances – almost twice the Premier League average of 162. They were in the top two for community appearances again in 2007–08, with 374 – a 17% increase on the previous season.

Middlesbrough's mascot is Roary the Lion. The club runs Roary's Children's Charity Fund which purchases items for local children's charities.

In 2009, steel producer Corus Group announced the possibility that it would mothball its Teesside plant, with up to 4,000 employees and contractors facing redundancy, after a consortium of steel magnates walked away from a 10-year deal. Middlesbrough Football Club helped with the "Save Our Steel" campaign by hosting dozens of steel workers and their families as they marched around the ground, promoted the campaign via the stadium's PA system, scoreboards and in match day programmes, while players wore T-shirts during warm-ups promoting the campaign. Chairman Steve Gibson said:

Honours

Domestic

League
Division Two / Division One / EFL Championship:
 Winners: 1926–27, 1928–29, 1973–74, 1994–95
 Runners-up: 1997–98, 2015–16
 Play-off winners: 1988
Division Three / Division Two / EFL League One:
Runners-up: 1966–67, 1986–87
Northern League:
 Winners: 1893–94, 1894–95, 1896–97

Cup
League Cup
Winners: 2003–04
Runners-up: 1996–97, 1997–98
FA Cup
Runners-up: 1996–97
FA Amateur Cup
Winners: 1895, 1898
Full Members Cup
Runners-up: 1989–90
North Riding Senior Cup
Winners on 55 occasions since 1882

International
UEFA Cup
Runners-up: 2005–06
Anglo-Scottish Cup
Winners: 1976
Kirin Cup
Winners: 1980

European Football

Non-playing staff

Corporate hierarchy

Coaching staff

Academy coaching staff

Players

Current squad

Out on loan

Reserves and Academy

Notable players

Middlesbrough Legends
These 10 players were voted for by fans as part of a campaign with the Evening Gazette.

 George Camsell
 George Hardwick
 Wilf Mannion
 Brian Clough
 John Hickton
 Willie Maddren
 Tony Mowbray
 Bernie Slaven
 Juninho
 Gareth Southgate

Top appearances

These players made more than 430 appearances during their time at the club. The number in brackets indicates the number of appearances in all competitions.

 Tim Williamson (602)
 Gordon Jones (532)
 John Hickton (499)
 John Craggs (487)
 Jim Platt (481)
 George Camsell (453)
 Jacky Carr (449)
 Mark Schwarzer (446)
 David Armstrong (431)

Top goalscorers

These players scored more than 140 goals during their time with the club. The number in brackets indicates the number of goals scored in all competitions.

 George Camsell (345)
 George Elliott (213)
 Brian Clough (204)
 John Hickton (193)
 Micky Fenton (162)
 Bernie Slaven (146)
 Alan Peacock (141)

Player of the Year award winners

Football League 100 Legends
The Football League 100 Legends is a list of 100 legendary football players produced by The Football League in 1998, to celebrate the 100th season of League football.

 Alf Common
 George Camsell
 Steve Bloomer
 Wilf Mannion
 George Hardwick
 Nobby Stiles
 Graeme Souness
 Bryan Robson
 Paul Gascoigne

English Football Hall of Fame
The English Football Hall of Fame is housed at The National Football Museum in Manchester, England. The Hall aims to celebrate and highlight the achievements of top English footballers and footballers who have played in England. These players appeared for or managed Middlesbrough at some point in their careers.

 Brian Clough (2002 inductee)
 Paul Gascoigne (2002 inductee)
 Bryan Robson (2002 inductee)
 Viv Anderson (2004 inductee)
 Wilf Mannion (2004 inductee)
 Jack Charlton (2005 inductee)
 Graeme Souness (2007 inductee)
 Nobby Stiles (2007 inductee)
 Terry Venables (2007 inductee)
 Steve Bloomer (2008 inductee)
 Malcolm Allison (2009 inductee)
 Raich Carter (2013 inductee)
 Paul Ince (2021 inductee)

Scottish Football Hall of Fame
The following former Middlesbrough players and managers have been inducted into the Scottish Football Hall of Fame.

 Bobby Murdoch (2004 inductee)
 Graeme Souness (2004 inductee)
 Gordon Strachan (2007 inductee)

Managers

The following are all the full-time Middlesbrough managers since the club turned professional in 1899.

See also
Middlesbrough W.F.C. – Middlesbrough Women Football Club

References and notes

External links

Official websites
 MFC.co.uk Official club website
 Middlesbrough at The Football League's official website

News sites
 
 Middlesbrough news from Sky Sports

Fan/other websites
MFC Women F.C. official site

 
Football clubs in England
Sport in Middlesbrough
Premier League clubs
English Football League clubs
Association football clubs established in 1876
Football clubs in North Yorkshire
EFL Cup winners
EFL Championship clubs
1876 establishments in England
Northern Football League
Companies that have entered administration in the United Kingdom